TV6 Estonia is an entertainment television channel broadcasting to Estonia featuring series, music, fashion and sports.

The channel's programming has been primarily geared towards men, and features a selection of cartoons, TV series and movies from comedy, reality, action-adventure, science fiction, fantasy, and horror genres.

Local programming typically features one local soap opera, one local reality television show, and a bevy of local sports shows and live sports transmissions.

Television shows broadcast on the channel are mostly U.S.-based, and current fare includes The Simpsons, Family Guy, Fresh Off the Boat, The Big Bang Theory, Agents of S.H.I.E.L.D., New Girl, and Last Man on Earth.

History and availability
It was launched on 24 March 2008, as all of the current channels (the big three – ETV, Kanal 2, TV3) were obliged to have digital sister channels at or by the end of March 2008. On 9 January 2010, although TV6 Estonia did leave the free-to-air MUX1, it continues programming in terrestrial subscription-based MUX2, and is also available on cable and IPTV. Estonia turned analogue television transmissions off on 1 July 2010.

TV6, as with other channels of the All Media Baltics group in the Baltic states, switched to HD broadcasting on 26 July 2018.

Selection of currently airing programming
As of January 2017:

The A-Team
Agents of S.H.I.E.L.D.
Alarm für Cobra 11 – Die Autobahnpolizei
America's Funniest Home Videos
Ax Men
Beauty & the Beast (2012 TV series)
The Big Bang Theory
Blue Bloods
Bob's Burgers
Bones
Brickleberry
Container Wars
 (Life in the Centre of the City, an Estonian soap opera)
Extreme Makeover: Home Edition
Family Guy
Fresh Off the Boat
Hawaii 5-0
Homeland
Last Man on Earth
New Girl
NCIS
 (Paradise Hotel, Russian version, reality TV)
Power Hit Radio KICKSTART (night chat show)
Royal Pains
Salem
The Simpsons
South Park
Stargate SG-1
Strongman Champions League
Top Gear (2002 TV series)
The X-Files
Vikings (2013 TV series)

Previous programming
13: Fear is Real
Access Hollywood
American Idol
The Cleaner (TV series)
Californication (TV series)
Criss Angel Mindfreak
The Dead Zone (TV series)
Eureka (TV series)
Futurama
Harper's Island
Highlander: The Raven
 (Morningstudio)
How I Met Your Mother
In Plain Sight
Journeyman (TV series)
King of Kings
 (Movieminutes)
 (Home in the Center of the City)

Life on Mars (U.S. TV series)
Mad About You
Maximum Exposure
Mental (TV series)
My Name Is Earl
 (Womensworld)
Nash Bridges
The Office (U.S. TV series)
The Pretender (TV series)
Prison Break
Queer Eye
The Return of Jezebel James
Scare Tactics
The Sentinel (TV series)
Sex and the City
Stargate Atlantis
The Strip (Australian TV series)
Swingtown
The Unit
Whacked Out Sports
Wipeout (2008 U.S. game show)

Source

References

External links

Television channels in Estonia
TV6 Estonia
Television channels and stations established in 2008
2008 establishments in Estonia
Mass media in Tallinn